Doherty Memorial High School is a public high school of commerce located in Worcester, Massachusetts, United States.  It opened its doors in the fall of 1966, replacing two closing schools: Worcester Classical High School and Worcester Commerce High School.

The school was named for Dr. Leo T. Doherty, an educator, who, over a period of forty years, served Worcester as a teacher, art director, assistant superintendent, and superintendent of schools.

The school has about 2,000 students, in grades 9 to 12, in the Worcester Public Schools district. The school's principal is Sally Maloney. The school offers 24 AP courses, with more available through Virtual High School. The school serves the west side (Pleasant & Chandler Street, Tatnuck Square, Salisbury Street, Forest Grove, Newton Square, and June, Mill, Pleasant, and May Streets neighborhoods) of Worcester.

Competitive teams
Doherty Memorial High School has varsity teams in math and these sports: track, volleyball, baseball, lacrosse, football, cross country, soccer, field hockey, basketball, cheerleading, tennis, and FIRST Robotics.

The Doherty football team won the Massachusetts Division 4 State Championship at Gillette Stadium in 2013, defeating Dennis-Yarmouth by a score of 28–26.

Notable alumni
 Donnie Demers, songwriter, musician
 Jimmy Demers, singer, songwriter
 Ned Eames (1978), former professional tennis player
 Jeffrey Greene, real estate developer
 David Green, university administrator
 Wadeline Jonathas (2016), Olympic gold medalist
 Mary Beth Leonard (1980), U.S. Ambassador to Nigeria
 Keith Reed (1996), former MLB player (Baltimore Orioles)
 Edwin Rodríguez, boxer
 Sam Seder (1984), comedian, writer, actor, film director, television producer-director, and talk radio host
 Yawin Smallwood (2010), NFL player (2014 Tennessee Titans practice squad)
 Doug Stanhope (did not graduate), comedian
 Isaac Yiadom (2014), NFL player

References

External links
Doherty Memorial High School website
 DMHS 1969 alumni website

High schools in Worcester, Massachusetts
Public high schools in Massachusetts